HMS Nigeria (pennant number 60) was a  light cruiser of the Royal Navy completed early in World War II and served during that conflict. She was named after the British colony of Nigeria.

Career

Home waters

Nigeria served in Home waters and off the Scandinavian coast for the early part of the war. The German ship was detected through the use of HF/DF. The crew of Lauenburg abandoned ship after they were fired upon, allowing the British to board her. Valuable codebooks and parts of the Enigma machine were found aboard and recovered. This was one of the earliest captures of Enigma material of the war, and came a few weeks after the destroyer  had captured the first complete Enigma machine from the German submarine  on 9 May 1941.

In July 1941, Nigeria became the flagship of Force K, commanded by Rear Admiral Philip Vian. During this period, Force K made two expeditions to Spitsbergen (Norwegian territory), the first to ascertain the situation and the second, in September, to escort a troopship, with Canadian troops and a team of demolition experts (see Operation Gauntlet). Their task was to evacuate Norwegian and Soviet personnel from the archipelago and destroy coalmines and fuel stocks that might be of use to the enemy. Bear Island was also visited to destroy a German weather station. The two cruisers of the task force, Nigeria and  diverted to intercept a German convoy. During this action, Nigeria sank the German training ship , but suffered serious damage to her bow, possibly having detonated a mine. On return to Britain, she was sent to Newcastle for repairs.

The Mediterranean and Far East
Nigeria was then assigned to operate in the Mediterranean. On 12 August 1942 she was participating in Operation Pedestal, escorting a convoy bound for Malta. She was the flagship of the close escort group, commanded by Admiral Harold Burrough. Nigeria was torpedoed and damaged by the  but managed to make it back to Gibraltar escorted by three destroyers. 52 crew were killed in the attack. Admiral Burrough meanwhile transferred his flag to the destroyer  whilst Nigeria returned to Gibraltar.

She was sent from there to the United States for repairs, which took nine months to complete. Nigeria was then assigned to operate with the Eastern Fleet from February 1944 until December 1945, when she returned to the UK to be refitted. During her time in the far east, she participated in raids on Sumatra.

Post war

Nigeria survived the war and continued in service with the Royal Navy, as the only Colony-class cruiser, maintaining four triple 6-inch turrets, 'X' turret finally being removed in 1954. In 1954 she was sold to India and went under reconstruction, largely on the pattern of the rebuild of HMS Newfoundland, possibly incorporating some of the electronics and radar intended by the RAN to be used on the refit of HMAS Hobart, which was abandoned. On 29 August 1957 she was recommissioned into the Indian Navy, who renamed her Mysore. During her time with the Indian Navy, she collided with the destroyer , severely damaging Hogues bow. Mysore was in service for a further 28 years until she was decommissioned on 20 August 1985.

Notes

References

External links

 HMS Nigeria at naval-history.net
 HMS Nigeria at Uboat.net
 HMS Nigeria at hmsnigeria.com

Crown Colony-class cruisers of the Royal Navy
Ships built on the River Tyne
1939 ships
World War II cruisers of the United Kingdom